Pan Zuyin (1830–1890) was a high-ranking Qing dynasty mandarin and a major art collector. He was president of the Board of Works, president of Board of War, and grand councilor. In 1860, Zuo Zongtang (1812–1885), the Viceroy of Shaan-Gan  was claimed to impeachment in the  court.   At that time, Pan Zuyin, a politician in the Qing governor to Zuo Zongtang submitted three petitions to the Xianfeng Emperor (1831–1861). Pan said that the country could not do without Hunan and Hunan could not do without Zuo Zongtang. It moved the Xianfeng Emperor greatly and saved Zuo Zongtang. In 1875, Zuo Zongtang presented Da Yu ding he treasured as a gift to Pan Zuyin in return for his great assist. Pan Zuyin was a famous collector with rich knowledge in Chinese characters. In Beijing, he has "Pangu Pavilion" to preserve  antiques including  ancient  bronzes.　In 1872, he wrote　"Pangu Pavilion Bronze  inscriptions".  Later, in 1890,  Pan acquired the Da Ke ding, the second largest bronzeware of the Western Zhou dynasty after the Da Yu ding. These two tripods brought great credit to the Pan family.  Pan couldn't get a son to inherit his family property. In 1883, Pan  retired  for  his  father's funeral. In 1890, Pan died in Beijing. His younger brother Pan Zunian (1870–1925)  inherited the family property.

References

1830 births
1890 deaths
Grand Councillors of the Qing dynasty
Qing dynasty politicians from Jiangsu
Chinese antiques experts
Politicians from Suzhou
Qing dynasty writers
Writers from Suzhou